Wellen may refer to:

Places
Wellen, a municipality in Belgium
Wellen, Saxony-Anhalt, a municipality in Saxony-Anhalt, Germany
Wellen, Rhineland-Palatinate, a municipality in Rhineland-Palatinate, Germany

People with the surname
Niklas Wellen (born 1994), German field hockey player
Remy Wellen (born 1938), German ice hockey forward

Others
Wellen (novel), a 1911 novel by Eduard von Keyserling

See also
Wellens